Colaspis costipennis is a species of leaf beetle from North America. It is mostly found in coastal states; in the United States, its range extends from Louisiana and Georgia north to New Hampshire and Pennsylvania, and in Canada, it is reported from Ontario. It was originally described as a variety of Colaspis brunnea, but it is now recognised as a distinct species.

References

Further reading

 

Eumolpinae
Articles created by Qbugbot
Beetles described in 1873
Taxa named by George Robert Crotch
Beetles of North America